Johanna Elizabeth Santelis Martínez (born 3 October 1989), known as Elizabeth Martínez, is a Dominican footballer who plays as a midfielder for Bob Soccer FC and the Dominican Republic women's national team.

Club career
Martínez has played for La Romana, Tiki Taka FC and Bob Soccer FC in the Dominican Republic.

International career
Martínez represented the Dominican Republic at the 2004 CONCACAF U-19 Women's Qualifying Tournament and the 2006 CONCACAF Women's U-20 Championship qualification. At senior level, she capped during two CONCACAF Women's Olympic Qualifying Tournament qualifications (2008 and 2012), the 2010 CONCACAF Women's World Cup Qualifying qualification and the 2012 CONCACAF Women's Olympic Qualifying Tournament.

References

External links

1989 births
Living people
Dominican Republic women's footballers
Women's association football midfielders
Dominican Republic women's international footballers
LGBT association football players
Dominican Republic LGBT people